Waynesville is an unincorporated community and census-designated place (CDP) in Brantley County, Georgia, United States. It is part of the Brunswick, Georgia Metropolitan Statistical Area.  Its ZIP code is 31566.

It was first listed as a CDP in the 2020 census with a population of 331.

Geography
Waynesville is located near the old Post Road which is the dividing line between the counties of  Brantley and Glynn.

History
Waynesville derives its name from Wayne County, of which it once was a part of. Records are contradictory so it is unclear when exactly Waynesville held the county seat.

Demographics

2020 census

Note: the US Census treats Hispanic/Latino as an ethnic category. This table excludes Latinos from the racial categories and assigns them to a separate category. Hispanics/Latinos can be of any race.

See also
List of county seats in Georgia (U.S. state)

References

External links
The Story of Miss Goertner Mumford

Unincorporated communities in Brantley County, Georgia
Brunswick metropolitan area
Census-designated places in Brantley County, Georgia
Former county seats in Georgia (U.S. state)